Francis Hugh Curran Sr. (September 9, 1922 – September 18, 2004) was an American professional basketball player. He spent one season in the Basketball Association of America (BAA) and one season in the BAA's later incarnation, the National Basketball Association (NBA). He played with the Rochester Royals during the 1948–49 and 1949–50 seasons. He attended the University of Notre Dame.

BAA/NBA career statistics

Regular season

Playoffs

External links

1922 births
2004 deaths
American Basketball League (1925–1955) players
American men's basketball players
Basketball players from Pennsylvania
Guards (basketball)
Notre Dame Fighting Irish men's basketball players
Rochester Royals players
Toledo Jeeps players
Undrafted National Basketball Association players